Haass or Haaß is a German surname. Notable people with the surname include:

Christian Haass (born 1960), German biochemist
Friedrich Joseph Haass (1780–1853), Russian physician
Lillian K. Haass, YWCA worker in Shanghai, China, between 1914 and 1945.
Michael Haaß (born 1983), German handball player
Richard N. Haass (born 1951), American diplomat

German-language surnames